Jukka Sauso (born 20 June 1982) is a Finnish former footballer.

Sauso is a big and strong central defender, but is often used as a last minute solution up front because of his notorious heading skills. When Sauso was playing for Örgryte IS in the Swedish Allsvenskan in 2006, he also started some matches as a striker.

Sauso played for Vaasan Palloseura and FC Hämeenlinna in Veikkausliiga before moving to Sweden and Örgryte for the 2005 season. He was a big hit in his first season in Allsvenskan and was near to move to Wisła Kraków. After playing two seasons in Allsvenskan and a third in Superettan for Örgryte, he moved back to Finland for the 2008 season.

Sauso was promoted to the senior squad of the Finnish national team in 2005. He was also a part of the Finland squad at the 2001 FIFA World Youth Championship.

References

External links
 Profile at HJK.fi
 
 

1982 births
Living people
Sportspeople from Vaasa
Finnish footballers
Association football central defenders
Vaasan Palloseura players
FC Hämeenlinna players
Örgryte IS players
Helsingin Jalkapalloklubi players
Veikkausliiga players
Allsvenskan players
Superettan players
Finland international footballers
Finland youth international footballers
Finnish expatriate footballers
Expatriate footballers in Sweden
Jönköpings Södra IF players